The Warenai River is a river in northern New Guinea, Indonesia. Tributaries include the Wapoga River.

Geography
The river flows in the northern area of Papua with predominantly tropical rainforest climate (designated as Af in the Köppen-Geiger climate classification). The annual average temperature in the area is 23 °C. The warmest month is February, when the average temperature is around 24 °C, and the coldest is November, at 22 °C. The average annual rainfall is 5824 mm. The wettest month is March, with an average of 733 mm rainfall, and the driest is October, with 300 mm rainfall.

See also
List of rivers of Indonesia
List of rivers of Western New Guinea

References

Rivers of Central Papua
Rivers of Indonesia